Eugene Lawrence (born June 22, 1986) is an American professional basketball player for BC Novosibirsk of the Russian Basketball Super League 1.

College career
After a successful high school career, Lawrence went on to play for St. John's University. Currently, Lawrence is ranked third in total assists among players in St. John's history.

Professional career
Eugene went to play in Slovakia for SPU Nitra from 2008 to 2009, where he was named Player of the Year and won the Finals with his team. He then moved to the Czech Republic for three seasons. While playing for BK Prostejov from 2009 to 2011, Lawrence was runner-up in the Czech League for two seasons. In his second season there, he was named MVP of the All-Star Game. His team made it to EuroChallenge last 16 in the 2010–11 season. In the 2011–12 season, he then moved to ČEZ Nymburk, where he won the Czech championship. He was named to the All-Star team starting five for the second season in a row.

From 2012 to 2014, Lawrence played in Ukraine for BC Goverla. During his second season he left the team due to political hardships and civil war within the country. He then moved to Germany to play for Telekom Baskets Bonn.

In September 2016, Lawrence returned to ČEZ Nymburk. With Nymburk, Lawrence won three National Basketball League (NBL) titles and three Czech Cup titles in three years.

For the 2019–20 season, Lawrence signed with Ionikos Nikaias of the Greek Basket League.

On January 8, 2020, he signed back with Telekom Bonn of the Basketball Bundesliga.

On December 15, 2020, Lawrence returned to Greece for Charilaos Trikoupis. He averaged 5.1 points, 5.5 assists, 2.5 rebounds, and 1.2 steals per game. On February 8, 2022, Lawrence signed with BC Novosibirsk of the Russian Basketball Super League 1.

References

External links

 Euroleague profile
 German BBL profile
 Eurobasket.com profile
 St. John's Red Storm bio

1986 births
Living people
Abraham Lincoln High School (Brooklyn) alumni
African-American basketball players
American expatriate basketball people in Germany
American expatriate basketball people in Slovakia
American expatriate basketball people in the Czech Republic
American expatriate basketball people in Ukraine
American men's basketball players
Basketball players from New York City
BC Hoverla players
Basketball Nymburk players
Ionikos Nikaias B.C. players
Point guards
Sportspeople from Brooklyn
St. John's Red Storm men's basketball players
Telekom Baskets Bonn players
21st-century African-American sportspeople
20th-century African-American people